Pavol Grman (born 10 February 1992) is a Slovak football defender who currently plays for the low division OFK Hrušovany.

Career

FC Nitra
He made his debut for FC Nitra against MŠK Žilina on 9 March 2012.

External links
FC Nitra profile

References

1992 births
Living people
Slovak footballers
Association football defenders
FC Nitra players
Slovak Super Liga players